Pinabacdao, officially the Municipality of Pinabacdao, is a 4th class municipality in the province of Samar, Philippines. According to the 2020 census, it has a population of 18,136 people.

It is considered as the center of rice production in the province of Samar. The home of Mayaw-Mayaw Festival, an ethnic and dance festival celebrated every May 10 of each year. Mayaw-Mayaw Festival won second runner-up in the festival dance competition and first prize winner in the float design competition during the 2015 Aliwan Fiesta which was held on April 23–25 in the cities of Manila and Pasay.

Etymology

The term "Pinabácdao" or "Pinabakdaw" is a Waray Sinamar-Lineyte dialect that means "asked to stand" in English Language or simply "pinatayó" in Filipino Language. But in the book Atlas de Filipinas by José María Algué, SJ - a Spanish-Roman Catholic priest and meteorologist in the observatory of Manila published in 1899 (In 1900 published in English: Atlas of the Philippine Islands by the U.S. Coast and Geodetic Survey now U.S. National Geodetic Survey); Pinabacdao was cited as Pinabágdao and listed as a pueblo or town in the former island province of Samar.

Due to lack of official and authenticated historical accounts pertaining to the origin of the town's name, the municipal government is only relying on folktales which were handed from prominent ancestors to their eager descendants. Folktales revealed that the town of Pinabacdao got its present name by the time when the Philippines was still under the Spanish colonial era; the provincial governor of Samar asked Capitan Doquerez (believed to be the founder and first mayor of Pinabacdao) as to what punishment he would impose to those who violated any rule or law. Doquerez insisted that he will not impose fines and imprisonment, instead they will be punished by asking them to "bakdaw" or stand on an ant colony. The Spanish governor was then amused and concluded that since the punishment or "pena" in Spanish language is to "bakdaw" or stand the town deserves to be called "Pena-bakdaw" (respelled as Pinabacdao).

Another folktale or legend surrounding the town suggests that Pinabacdao's name was derived from miscommunication. These was the time when according to the folktale during the early years of settlement, officers from the Samar provincial government (probably on a mapping, census or exploratory survey) passed along the newly organized town and saw a man tied on a pole, standing on an ant colony. The Spanish officers asked one of the townsmen as to what is the name of the place. The townsman, not understanding the question in Spanish and thinking that the officer was pertaining to the tied man standing on ant colony immediately replied in Waray-waray dialect - "Pinabakdaw" or simply "asked to stand". This story was believed to be the reason why the bureaucrats recorded the name of the town as Pinabacdao.

In terms of official government record, the town is officially known as Pinabacdao by virtue of Executive Order No. 2 signed by president Manuel A. Roxas on July 8, 1946, and took effect on July 16, 1946.

History
Pinabacdao was established in 1749 but became a barrio in 1902 as part of the Municipality of Calbiga. It was then reestablished by Executive Order No. 02 series of 1946 issued by President Manuel A. Roxas, and separated from Calbiga as a reestablished municipality on July 16, 1946.

Geography
Pinabacdao lies at the southwest central coast of Samar Island and crossed along by the Pan-Philippine Highway. Pinabacdao is bordered to the north by the municipality of Calbiga; to the east by the capital city of Borongan in the province of Eastern Samar; to the west by the municipality of Villareal and Villareal Bay; and to the south by the municipalities of Sta. Rita and Basey.

Barangays
The municipality of Pinabacdao is politically divided into 24 barangays, the smallest unit of local government in the Philippines. Each barangay has its own chairperson and councilors which forms the barangay council.

For administrative and statistical convenience, barangays are group into two districts - the Pinabacdao East District and Pinabacdao West District. The East district is composed of barangays situated in high altitude areas or those located in the eastern part of the municipality. Barangays located along Pan-Philippine Highway/National Road or commonly referred as Maharlika Highway comprises the West District or those located along the western coastal and lowland areas. These districts have no form of any local government.

Climate

Pinabacdao's climate is classified as tropical. Pinabacdao is a town with a significant rainfall. Even in the driest month there is a lot of rain. This location is classified as Af by Köppen and Geiger. The average annual temperature is 27.1 °C in Pinabacdao. The average annual rainfall is 2739 mm.

Demographics

Economy

Education

To carry out its mandates and objectives, the Philippine Department of Education is organized into two major structural components. The Central Office maintains the overall administration of basic education at the national level. The Field Offices are responsible for the regional and local coordination and administration of the Department's mandate.

At the sub-national level, the Field Offices are consist of regional offices and provincial/city schools division. Under the supervision of the provincial/city schools division offices are school districts.

School District Pinabacdao

Before the creation of a separate school district for the municipality, schools were under the supervision of the District Pinabacdao-San Sebastian. But due to an increasing number of schools in the municipality, Pinabacdao and San Sebastian municipalities had their own school district . The School District Pinabacdao is tasked to manage and govern schools except the three secondary schools which are under the direct supervision of the Schools Division of Samar.

Primary Schools

 Bugho Primary School (BPS)
 Canlobo Primary School (CanPS)
 Catigawan Primary School (CPS)
 Loctob Primary School (LPS)
 Magdawat Primary School (MPS)

Elementary schools

 Bangon Elementary School (BES)
 Botoc Elementary School (BotES)
 Calampong Elementary School (CES)
 Dolores Elementary School (DES)
 Lale Elementary School (LES)
 Laygayon Elementary School (LayES)
 Madalunot Elementary School (MadES)
 Mambog Elementary School (MES)
 Nabong Elementary School (NES)
 Obayan Elementary School (OES)
 Pahug Elementary School (PES)
 Parasanon Elementary School (ParES)
 Pinabacdao Central Elementary School (PCES)

Secondary/High Schools

College and Training Center
 Pinabacdao One-Stop Training Center (POSTC)
 University of Eastern Philippines- Pinabacdao College of Agriculture (UEP-PCA)

See also
 List of renamed cities and municipalities in the Philippines

References

External links

 Pinabacdao Profile at PhilAtlas.com
 [ Philippine Standard Geographic Code]
 Philippine Census Information
 Local Governance Performance Management System

Municipalities of Samar (province)